Mordella anticelunulata is a species of beetle in the genus Mordella of the family Mordellidae, which is part of the superfamily Tenebrionoidea. It was discovered in 1936 in Argentina.

References

Beetles described in 1936
anticelunulata